Spilonota pyrusicola is a species of moth of the family Tortricidae. It is found in China (Beijing, Liaoning, Henan).

The larvae feed on Pyrus species and Crataegus pinnatifida.

References

Moths described in 1994
Eucosmini